After the liturgical reforms of Vatican II, Pope Paul VI presented a 1974 document as a "minimum repertoire of Gregorian chant", which the faithful should learn to sing. In promulgating the booklet, the Congregation for Divine Worship stated that the book would be "extremely useful if the faithful learn the chants contained in the volume, as the Pope and the Congregation for Divine Worship intend."

The Maltese choir, Jubilate Deo, is named after this document.

Contents

Chants of the Ordinary
Kyrie XVI
Gloria VIII
Credo III
Sanctus XVIII
Pater Noster
Agnus Dei XVIII
Verbum Domini
Mysterium Fidei
Ite Missa est

Hymns
Adoro Te Devote
Alma Redemptoris Mater
Ave maris stella
Ave Regina caelorum
O Salutaris Hostia
Pange Lingua/Tantum Ergo
Parce Domine
Regina caeli
Salve Regina
Veni Creator Spiritus
Ubi Caritas

References

External links 
"Jubilate Deo", Adoremus Bulletin
Why Sacred Music Matters, St. Cecilia Schola

Christian chants
Catholic music